New Look bus may refer to:

Flxible New Look bus, a very popular transit bus produced by The Flxible Company from 1960 until 1978
GM New Look bus, also commonly known by the nickname "Fishbowl" (for its six-piece rounded windshield), a transit bus introduced in 1959 by Truck and Coach Division of General Motors and produced until 1986
Western Flyer D700 bus, introduced in 1967 by Western Flyer Coach, which became New Flyer in 1986